Yosef Goldstein (29 March 1932 - 1 November 2020) was an Israeli footballer. He played in 25 matches for the Israel national football team from 1953 to 1961.

References

External links
 

1932 births
2020 deaths
Israeli footballers
Israel international footballers
Place of birth missing
Association footballers not categorized by position